The Rebel is a 1980 poliziottesco film directed by Stelvio Massi.

Cast 
Maurizio Merli as Nicola
Jutta Speidel as Vivien
Francisco Rabal as Tony
Arthur Brauss as Klaus Beitz
Reinhard Kolldehoff as Hermann Stoll

Production
The Rebel was shot at CCC Filmkunst in Berlin and on Location in Formello, Venice and Berlin. Merli spoke about the film stating that his crew and him "left for Germany in January 1980. It was amazing to shoot in Berlin stadium where Hitler used to deliver his speeches to the masses, especially since it was a gloomy day, with the sky completely covered with clouds. I had shivers watching the field completely covered with white snow, and all around the black marble that the stadium was built of."

The film was made under the original title Poliziotto solitudine e rabbia. The Italian version of the film was edited by Mauro Bonanni while the German version was edited by Sybille Windt.

Release
The Rebel was distributed in Italy by Medusa on 22 August 1980 with a 102 minute running time. The film grossed a total of 508 million Italian lira. It was released in West Germany on 20 February 1981 with an 87 minute runtime as Knallharte Profis. It was released on home video on VHS in Italy by AVO and as Il rebelle by Eureka.

References

Sources

External links

1980 films
West German films
Poliziotteschi films
Films scored by Stelvio Cipriani
1980s crime films
Films set in West Germany
Films set in Berlin
Films shot in Berlin
Films shot in Venice
1980s Italian films